Majin Rural District is a rural district (dehestan) in Majin District, Darreh Shahr County, Ilam Province, Iran. At the 2006 census, its population was 3,166, in 619 families.  The rural district has 24 villages.

References 

Rural Districts of Ilam Province
Darreh Shahr County